Taiwan Sugar Corporation (TSC; ; pinyin: Táiwān Tángyè Gōngsī) or Taisugar (pinyin: Táitáng) is a state-run enterprise of Taiwan, with headquarters in Tainan City.

History
The corporation was established on 1 May 1946 by the Nationalist government after the handover of Taiwan from Japan to Republican China, by merging all of the sugar companies (Dai-Nihon, Taiwan, Meiji, and Ensuiko Sugar Company) during the Japanese era in Taiwan. In the 1950s and 1960s, sugar was one of the major exports of Taiwan; the corporation remains a major land owner today.

Taiwan's sugar trade, which flourished for almost 400 years, is now a sunset industry. The Taiwan Sugar Corporation has diversified its business into tourism, floriculture, biotechnology, and retailing. It also operates a chain of gas stations and invests in Taiwan High Speed Rail. They also have a number of significant overseas investments. In 2020 Taiwan Sugar Corporation announced plans to close its largest pig farm in Vietnam and instead invest NT$10.7 billion (US$369 million) in remodeling and improving their pig farms in Taiwan.

TSC sugar plants
 Shanhua Sugar Factory in Shanhua District, Tainan City
 Huwei Sugar Factory in Huwei Township, Yunlin County
 Siaogang Sugar Refinery in Siaogang District, Kaohsiung City

Developments
Taiwan Sugar Corporation has five types of developments — Open Bid Construction, Joint Construction, Community Development, Sugar Factory Fields Development, and Student's Dormitory Development. It also owns the Taiwan Sugar Research Institute.

Land ownership

See also
 Taiwan Sugar Railways
 Taiwan Sugar Research Institute
 List of companies of Taiwan

References

Agriculture companies established in 1946
Agriculture companies of Taiwan
Food and drink companies established in 1946
Food and drink companies of Taiwan
Government-owned companies of Taiwan
Sugar companies
Taiwanese companies established in 1946